Seemann is the German word for sailor. It may refer to:

Seemann (surname)
 "Seemann" (Lolita song), released 1960 by Austrian singer Lolita
 "Seemann" (Rammstein song), a 1996 single by the German band Rammstein

See also
 Seeman (disambiguation)
 Zeeman (disambiguation)